jph or JPH or variation, may refer to:

People
 Judge of the Preliminary Hearing in the Italian Code of Criminal Procedure

Persons
 Jph Wacheski, Canadian video game developer and musician
 Jenn Korbee (born 1980, as Jennifer Peterson-Hind, "jph"), U.S. actress singer-songwriter

Other uses 
 Jhantipahari railway station (train station code JPH)
 Journal of the Philosophy of History (JPH)
 Junctophilin (JPH), family of proteins and genes

See also

 J. P. H. Acocks (1911–1971), South African botanist
 J.Ph. Sousa (1854–1932), U.S. composer and conductor
 J. Ph. Vogel (1871–1958), Dutch Sanskritist and epigrapher
 Williams JPH1, Formula 2 racecar